Millwall Football Club is a professional football club in Bermondsey, South East London, England. They compete in the EFL Championship, the second tier of English football. Founded as Millwall Rovers in 1885, the club has retained its name despite having last played in the Millwall area of the Isle of Dogs in 1910. From then until 1993, the club played at what is now called The Old Den in New Cross, before moving to its current home stadium nearby, called The Den. The traditional club crest is a lion rampant, referred to in the team's nickname 'The Lions'. Millwall's traditional kit consists of dark blue shirts, white shorts, and blue socks.

Millwall was one of the founding members of the Southern League in 1894. They competed in it for 22 seasons until 1920, claiming the title twice in 1895 and 1896. Since joining the Football League in the 1920–21 season, the club have been promoted eleven times (five times as champions in 1928, 1938, 1962, 1988, and 2001) and relegated nine times. They have spent 89 of their 96 seasons in the Football League yo-yoing between the second and third tiers. The club did have a brief spell in the top flight between 1988 and 1990, in which they achieved their highest ever league finish of tenth place in the First Division in 1988–89. Millwall reached the 2004 FA Cup final and qualified for Europe for the first time in their history, playing in the UEFA Cup. The club have also won two League One play-off finals in 2010 and 2017, the Football League Group Cup in 1983, and were Football League Trophy finalists in 1999.

In the media, Millwall's supporters have often been associated with hooliganism, with numerous films having been made fictionalising their notoriety. The fans are renowned for their terrace chant "No one likes us, we don't care". Millwall have a long-standing rivalry with West Ham United. The local derby between the two sides has been contested almost a hundred times since 1899. The club also share a rivalry with Leeds United, and contest the South East London derby with fellow local rivals in the district Crystal Palace and Charlton Athletic.

History

Beginnings, Southern League and relocation: 1885–1919

The club was founded as Millwall Rovers by the workers of J.T. Morton's canning and preserve factory in the Millwall area of the Isle of Dogs in London's East End in 1885. J.T. Morton was founded in Aberdeen in 1849 to supply sailing ships with food, the company opened their first English cannery and food processing plant at Millwall dock in 1872 and attracted a workforce from across the country, including the east coast of Scotland, primarily Dundee. The club secretary was 17-year-old Jasper Sexton, the son of the landlord of The Islander pub in Tooke Street where Millwall held their club meetings. Millwall Rovers' first fixture was held on a piece of waste ground on Glengall Road, on 3 October 1885 against Fillebrook, a team that played in Leytonstone. The newly formed team were beaten 5–0.

Rovers found a better playing surface for the 1886–87 season, at the rear of the Lord Nelson pub and it became known as the Lord Nelson Ground. In November 1886, the East End Football Association was formed, along with the Senior Cup Competition. Millwall made it to the final against London Caledonians, which was played at Leyton Cricket Ground. The match finished 2–2 and the teams shared the cup for six months each. Millwall won the East London Senior Cup at the first attempt. The club also won the cup in the following two years, and the trophy became their property.

In April 1889, a resolution was passed for Millwall to drop "Rovers" from their name, and they began playing under the name Millwall Athletic, inspired by their move to their new home The Athletic Grounds. They were founding members of the Southern Football League which they won for the first two years of its existence, and were runners-up in its third. During this period the club was invited to join the Second Division of the Football League but the committee turned down the opportunity, partly due to the expected increase in travel expenses but also to stay loyal to the Southern League. They were forced to move to a new ground North Greenwich in 1901, as the Millwall Dock Company wanted to use their land as a timberyard. Millwall Athletic reached the semi-finals of the FA Cup in 1900 and 1903, and were also champions of the Western Football League in 1908 and 1909. On 10 October 1910, Millwall played their last game as an East London club against Woolwich Arsenal in the London Challenge Cup. Millwall won the game 1–0 in front of a crowd of 3000.

Millwall moved to a new stadium, named The Den, in New Cross, South London in 1910. The club had previously occupied four different grounds in the 25 years since their formation in East London; limited expansion space on the Isle of Dogs meant The Lions had to move to boost support and attendances. The estimated cost of The Den was £10,000. The first match played at the new ground was on 22 October 1910 against reigning Southern League champions Brighton & Hove Albion, who won 1–0.

Entering the Football League: 1920–1939
Millwall, who had now also dropped "Athletic" from their name, were invited to join the Football League in 1920 for the 1920–21 season, along with 22 other clubs, through the creation of the new Football League Third Division. The Southern League was shorn of its status, with almost all its clubs deciding to leave—Millwall followed suit. Millwall's first Football League match was on 28 August 1920 at The Den, and they were 2–0 winners against Bristol Rovers.

In the 1925–26 season Millwall had 11 consecutive clean sheets, a Football League record, which they hold jointly with York City and Reading. Millwall became known as a hard-fighting Cup team and competed in various memorable matches, notably defeating three-time league winners and reigning champions Huddersfield Town 3–1 in the third round of the 1926–27 FA Cup. In the 1927–28 season Millwall won the Third Division South title and scored 87 goals at home in the league, an English record which still stands. Matches against Sunderland and Derby County saw packed crowds of 48,000-plus in the 1930s and 1940s. Their 1937 FA Cup run saw Millwall reach the semi-finals for the third time, and a fifth-round game against Derby still stands as Millwall's record attendance of 48,762. Millwall were the 11th best supported team in England in 1939, despite being in the Second Division. Millwall were one of the most financially wealthy clubs in England. The club proposed plans to improve the Den and signed international players. Winger Reg 'JR' Smith was capped twice, scoring two goals for England in 1938. The Lions were pushing for promotion to the First Division toward the end of the decade, but one week into the 1939–40 season, World War II broke out and Millwall were robbed of their aim.

Wartime doldrums and relegation to fourth tier: 1940–1965
On 7 April 1945, Millwall appeared in a Football League War Cup final at Wembley Stadium against Chelsea, but because it was a wartime cup final it is not acknowledged in the record books. With the war in Europe in its last days, the number of spectators allowed to attend games was relaxed. The attendance was 90,000, the largest crowd Millwall have ever played in front of, which included King George VI, whom the team were introduced to before kick-off.

The loss of so many young men during the Second World War made it difficult for clubs to retain their former status. This was especially true for Millwall, who appeared to suffer more than most. From being one of the country's biggest clubs before the war, Millwall were reduced to one of its smallest afterward. The Den sustained severe bomb damage on 19 April 1943, and one week later a fire, determined to have been caused by a discarded cigarette, also destroyed an entire stand. The club accepted offers from neighbours Charlton Athletic, Crystal Palace and West Ham United to stage games at their grounds. On 24 February 1944, Millwall returned to The Den, to play in an all-standing stadium. This was achieved with considerable volunteer labour by Lions fans.

Millwall's fortunes fluctuated in the immediate post war years, they were relegated to Division Three South in 1948 and had to apply for re-election to the league in 1950 after finishing in the bottom two. An upswing in fortunes saw Millwall finish 5th, 4th, and then runners up in Division Three South in 1952–53 season; but with only the Champions being promoted, Millwall found themselves stuck in the third tier despite averaging crowds of over 20,000. Millwall then suffered a down swing in fortunes with a number of bottom-half finishes. One highlight of the period was one of the biggest giant-killing upsets in the Fourth Round of the 1956–57 FA Cup on 26 January 1957, when Millwall beat Newcastle United 2–1 in front of a crowd of 45,646.
Millwall suffered the ill fortune of becoming a founding member of Division Four in 1958. While initially suffering from this reorganisation, the de-regionalisation of Third Division North and Third Division South opened up the way for promotion via the runner up spots. Millwall won the Division Four Title in 1962 with the help of 23 Goals from Peter Burridge and 22 from Dave Jones. They were relegated again in the 1963–64 season, but were to bounce back by winning back-to-back promotions as runner up. This is the last time Millwall played in the fourth tier.

Unbeaten home record and the class of '71: 1966–1987
Later in the decade, Millwall established a record of 59 home games without defeat (43 wins and 16 draws) from 22 August 1964 to 14 January 1967. During this spell, Millwall played 55 different teams, kept 35 clean sheets, scored 112 goals and conceded 33. This was thanks largely to managers Billy Gray, who laid the foundations, and Benny Fenton, a former player who continued to build on Gray's side. All the players, which included winger Barry Rowan, goalkeeper Alex Stepney and strikers Hugh Curran and Len Julians, were presented with a commemorative gold cigarette lighter by the Football Association. The record was eventually broken by Liverpool, who were unbeaten for 63 games at home between 1978 and 1981.

In the early 1970s, the Millwall team included many notable and memorable players, now remembered by some fans as "The Class of '71". This was a team that included; goalkeeper Bryan King, defender Harry Cripps, goalscoring midfielder Derek Possee, Millwall's most capped international player to date, Eamon Dunphy and the club's longest serving player, Barry Kitchener. They missed out on promotion to Division One by one point. By remaining unbeaten at home in Division Two for the 1971–72 season, Millwall became the only club to go through an entire season without losing a match at home in four different divisions 1927–28 Division Three South, 1964–65 Division Four, 1965–66 Division Three and 1971–72 Division Two. In 1974, Millwall hosted the first game to be played on a Sunday against Fulham. The Lions reached the quarter-finals of the League Cup in 1974, and again in 1977.

George Graham managed Millwall from 1983 to 1986, and during that time he guided the club to a Football League Group Cup win, beating Lincoln City 3–2 in the final in the 1982–83 season. The 1984–85 season was particularly successful, Millwall reached the FA Cup quarter-finals and gained promotion to the Second Division, going unbeaten at home again in Division Three, winning 18 games and drawing five. In the FA Cup they were beaten 1–0 by First Division Luton Town at Kenilworth Road. The match is remembered for all the wrong reasons, after hooligans rioted at the game. 81 people (including 31 police officers) were injured in the disturbances.

Promotion to top tier, new stadium and administration: 1988–2000
Graham's replacement was Glaswegian John Docherty. In his second season as manager, Millwall won the Second Division championship and gained promotion to the top flight of English football for the first time in the club's history. Starting the 1988–89 season strongly, Millwall topped the league on 1 October 1988 having played six games (winning four and drawing two) and rarely slipped out of the top five before Christmas. This was mainly due to Tony Cascarino and Teddy Sheringham, who scored 99 goals between them in three seasons playing together. Millwall's first top division season ended with a tenth-place finish, which was the lowest place occupied by the club all season. The following season, they briefly led the league for one night in September 1989 after beating Coventry City 4–1, but won only two more games all season and were relegated in 20th place at the end of the 1989–90 season.

Just before relegation was confirmed, Docherty was sacked and replaced by ex-Middlesbrough manager Bruce Rioch. Striker Teddy Sheringham, who later played for England and was the highest-scoring player throughout the Football League in the 1990–91 season, was sold to Nottingham Forest for £2 million after Millwall's 6–2 defeat to Brighton & Hove Albion in the Second Division play-offs. Rioch left Millwall in 1992 to be succeeded by Irish defender Mick McCarthy. McCarthy guided Millwall to third place in the new Division One at the end of the 1993–94 season. This was their first season at a new ground, at first known as The New Den (to distinguish it from its predecessor) but now called simply The Den, which was opened by the Labour party leader John Smith on 4 August 1993. The new ground was the first all-seater stadium to be built in England after the Taylor report on the Hillsborough disaster. The Lions knocked Arsenal out of the 1994–95 FA Cup in a third-round replay, beating them 2–0 at Highbury. They also reached the quarter-finals of the League Cup in
1995. Millwall lost 5–1 on aggregate to Derby County in the play-off semi-finals that same 1994–95 season, in a tie blighted by crowd trouble. McCarthy resigned to take charge of the Republic of Ireland national team on 5 February 1996, shortly after Millwall had been knocked off the top of the Division One table by Sunderland, following a 6–0 defeat.

Jimmy Nicholl of Raith Rovers was appointed as McCarthy's replacement, but could not reverse the slump in form which saw Millwall relegated at the end of the 1995–96 season in 22nd place. Just five months earlier they had been top of Division One, but now Millwall found themselves in the third tier for the 1996–97 season. The club experienced severe financial difficulties that resulted in them being placed in financial administration for a short time. Nicholl was relieved of his duties and John Docherty returned on a short-term basis to stabilise the club.

Millwall came out of administration, and new chairman Theo Paphitis appointed ex-West Ham United manager Billy Bonds as manager. The 1997–98 season was not a successful one, with the club hovering close to relegation to the fourth tier. Bonds was sacked and replaced by Keith "Rhino" Stevens, with Alan McLeary as his assistant. McLeary was later promoted to the role of joint-manager alongside Stevens. Stevens and McLeary led Millwall to their first ever official appearance at Wembley Stadium. The Lions reached the 1999 Football League Trophy Final with a golden goal win against Gillingham in the semi-finals, and a 2–1 aggregate victory over Walsall in the regional final. They faced Wigan Athletic in the final but, while playing in front of 49,000 of their own fans, lost 1–0 to an injury-time goal. Millwall also lost 1–0 on aggregate to Wigan in the Second Division play-off semi-finals the 1999–2000 season.

Champions, FA Cup Final and European football: 2001–2004
Mark McGhee was named as Millwall's new manager in September 2000, and eight months later the club won promotion as Division Two champions, with the team built by Keith Stevens, after five years in the third tier of the league. They finished with 93 points, a club record. Winning the first match of the 2001–02 season 4–0 at home to Norwich City set the team up well for a good year, in which Millwall qualified for the Division One play-offs, but lost to eventual winners Birmingham City 2–1 in the semi-finals. Millwall finished mid-table in the 2002–03 season and McGhee was sacked soon after the start of the 2003–04 season.

In 2003, Dennis Wise, ex-Chelsea and England player, became caretaker, and subsequently permanent player-manager, of the club. In his first season in charge Wise led the club to the first FA Cup Final in their history. When Millwall took to the field at the Millennium Stadium in Cardiff they were only the second team from outside the top flight to play in the Cup final since 1982, and were the first team from outside the Premier League to reach the final since the foundation of the top tier in 1992. The club was missing 16 players from their squad due to suspension or injury. They played the Cup final on 22 May 2004, losing 3–0 to Manchester United. As United had already qualified for the UEFA Champions League, Millwall were assured of playing in the UEFA Cup. Midfielder Curtis Weston, substituted for Wise with one minute of normal time remaining, became the youngest Cup final player in history at 17 years 119 days, beating the 125-year-old record of James F. M. Prinsep. In the 2004–05 UEFA Cup, Millwall lost 4–2 on aggregate in the first round proper to Hungarian champions Ferencváros, with Wise scoring both Millwall's goals.

Upheaval, stability and first play-off success: 2005–2013
In 2005, Theo Paphitis announced that he was stepping down as chairman of the club with Jeff Burnige to replace him from May 2005. At the end of the 2004–05 season, manager Dennis Wise announced that he was leaving as he was unable to form a working relationship with the new chairman. Former Millwall striker Steve Claridge was announced as the new player-manager of Millwall. However, when Burnige then stepped down just two months after taking up the post, it was announced on 27 July that Claridge had been sacked after just 36 days, without ever taking charge of the team in a competitive match. Former Wolverhampton Wanderers manager Colin Lee replaced him but lasted only five months in charge of the club. On 21 December, with the club bottom of the Championship, he became the club's Director of Football and was replaced as manager by 32-year-old player Dave Tuttle, on a short-term contract until the end of the 2005–06 season. Tuttle had no prior experience in football management. In February 2006, Lee left the club altogether. Millwall experienced a difficult season, having had four managers in 2005. Their 13 goals scored at home was the second worst in Football League history. Their relegation to League One was confirmed on 17 April 2006 with a 2–0 loss against Southampton. In the closed season Nigel Spackman was appointed as the new manager, but he lasted only four months after a string of bad results. In September 2006, Theo Paphitis (chairman from 1997 to 2005) ended his nine-year association with the club after a year-long spell as a non-executive director. On 19 March 2007, Willie Donachie signed a two-year contract following some progress which had seen the club climb to 11th place in the league. Before Donachie took charge, Millwall had taken only six points from their first ten games. In the 2007–08 season Millwall sat bottom of the table at the beginning of October. Donachie was sacked on 8 October, with Richard Shaw and Colin West becoming caretaker managers.

In March 2007, Chestnut Hill Ventures, led by American John Berylson, which have interests in business and financial services, retail, property and sport, invested £5 million into the club. The continued investment of Berylson, who has since become the club's major shareholder and chairman, has steered The Lions on a better course on and off the pitch. The appointment of Kenny Jackett as manager on 6 November 2007, proving crucial. Over the course of the next two seasons Jackett led Millwall to two top six finishes in League One, in fifth and third place respectively. He won the League One Manager of the Month award three times while in charge of the club. Several of his key signings helped propel Millwall toward the play-offs, and eventual promotion. After a play-off final defeat in the 2008–09 season against Scunthorpe United and losing out on automatic promotion on the last day of the 2009–10 season to Leeds United by one point, Millwall made it back to Wembley, finally breaking the play-off hoodoo run of five successive failures in 1991, 1994, 2000, 2002 and 2009, with a 1–0 win in the 2010 League One play-off final against Swindon Town, securing a return to the Football League Championship after a four-year absence.

Millwall's first game back in the Championship was a 3–0 away win at Bristol City. The game had been much hyped due to City's signing of then-England goalkeeper David James. Only days after the defeat, Steve Coppell resigned as City manager. The Lions celebrated the 125th anniversary of the club on 2 October 2010, which was the closest home game date to the first fixture Millwall ever played against Fillebrook on 3 October 1885. Millwall drew 1–1 with Burnley and wore a special one-off kit for the game, made by manufacturers Macron, which bore the names of every footballer who had played for the club. Kenny Jackett celebrated five years in charge of the club in November 2012, with a 4–1 victory away at Nottingham Forest. After a strong start to the 2012–13 season, including a 13-game unbeaten run and flirting with the play-offs, Millwall finished poorly, with only five wins in the last 23 games, narrowly avoiding relegation on the last day of the season. Their poor league form coincided with reaching the semi-final of the FA Cup for the fifth time in their history. They played Wigan Athletic at Wembley Stadium on 14 April 2013, losing 2–0 to the eventual cup winners. Kenny Jackett resigned on 7 May 2013. He was Millwall's fourth-longest serving manager. After a month of searching, Millwall appointed St Johnstone boss Steve Lomas as their new manager on 6 June 2013. His appointment provoked mixed emotions among some supporters, due to him being a former captain of West Ham United, their biggest rival. Club record goalscorer Neil Harris returned to Millwall as a coach on 23 June 2013 after retiring as a player through injury. Millwall sacked Lomas on 26 December 2013, after winning only five of his first 22 games in charge. Harris and youth team coach Scott Fitzgerald took over as joint caretaker-managers. On 4 January 2014 Millwall lost 4–1 at Southend United in the FA Cup, a team 31 places below them in the football pyramid. Harris described the performance as a "shambles."

FA Cup giant-killers and fifth trip to Wembley in eight years: 2014–present
The club appointed Ian Holloway as their new manager on 6 January 2014, with the club sitting 21st in the Championship table. He was given the priority of maintaining their Football League Championship status, which he achieved. Millwall went unbeaten in the last eight games of the 2013–14 season and finished in 19th place, four points above the relegation zone. The following season, Holloway was sacked on 10 March 2015 with the team second from bottom in the Championship, and Neil Harris was reinstated as caretaker manager until the end of the season. He was unable to ensure survival, however, as Millwall's relegation to League One was confirmed on 28 April with one game of the 2014–15 season still to play. Harris was confirmed as Millwall's permanent manager the next day. In his first full season in charge, Harris led Millwall to a fourth-place finish in League One and a play-off final at Wembley, which the Lions lost 3–1 to Barnsley.

In the 2016–17 FA Cup, Millwall reached the Quarter-finals for the tenth time in their history, knocking out Premier League opposition in three consecutive rounds: Bournemouth in the third round, Watford in the fourth round, and reigning Premier League champions Leicester City in the fifth round. On 28 February 2017, Millwall beat Peterborough United 1–0 and increased their unbeaten run to 16 games in all competitions, and have gone nine games without conceding a goal for the first time since the 1925–26 season. Millwall made it to the League One play-off final at Wembley for the second successive year, after beating Scunthorpe United 3–2 in the semi-final. They were promoted back to the Championship following a 1–0 playoff final victory over Bradford City, thanks to an 85th-minute winner from Steve Morison, his 86th goal for the club. In Millwall's return to the Championship in the 2017–18 season the team went on a club record 17-game unbeaten run; their longest streak in the second tier, which surpassed a record of 15 set in 1971. During the undefeated run they won six away wins in a row, equalling a club record set in the 2008–09 season. In the 2018–19 FA Cup, Millwall once again reached the Quarter-finals for an 11th time, only losing to Premier League side Brighton on penalties. In the previous round they knocked out Premier League side Everton, to equal Southampton's FA Cup 'Giant-killings' record, having knocked out 25 top-flight teams when not in the top flight themselves.

On 3 October 2019, Neil Harris resigned as Millwall manager with the club sitting in 18th place with two wins from their first ten Championship games. Harris led Millwall to Wembley twice, with one promotion, and two FA Cup quarter-finals during his tenure. He was the Lions fifth longest-serving manager, having spent four and a half years at the club. On 21 October, he was replaced by former Stoke City boss Gary Rowett, who beat his former club 2–0 in his very first game in charge. The 2019–20 season ended in an 8th-placed finish, after a late play-off run came up short. Rowett then guided the club to 11th and 9th the following two seasons.

Colours, crest and nickname

Kit

Millwall's traditional kit has predominantly consisted of blue shirts, white shorts and blue socks throughout their 125-year history. For the first 50 years, up until 1936, they played in a traditional navy blue, similar to the colours of Scotland national team. This colour was chosen because it paid homage to the Scottish roots of the club, with the nucleus of the first Millwall Rovers squad being from Dundee. In 1936, newly appointed Millwall manager Charlie Hewitt opted to change the kit colour from navy blue to a lighter royal blue, and the team played in this colour for the best part of 74 years, with the exception of 1968–75 and 1999–2001, in which the team played in an all-white strip. Their kit for the 2010–11 season celebrated the 125th anniversary of the club, with Millwall adopting the darker navy blue of their first strip. The club has retained this colour since. As for change colours, white shirts and blue shorts or yellow shirts and black shorts have been the Lions primary away colours. They have also played in red and black stripes, all grey, all orange, all red, and green and white stripes. Millwall wore a special one-off camouflage kit to commemorate the centenary of the First World War against Brentford on 8 November 2014. It went on sale to fans, with proceeds going to Headley Court, a rehabilitation centre for injured members of the British Armed Forces.

Badge
The club crest has been a rampant lion since 1936, which was also introduced by Charlie Hewitt. There have been many variations of the lion; the first was a single red lion, often mistakenly said to be chosen because of the club's Scottish roots. The lion bore a striking resemblance to signs used by pubs named The Red Lion. From 1956 to 1974 Millwall's crest was two leaping red lions facing each other. Former chairman Theo Paphitis brought back the badge in 1999, where it was used for a further eight years. The current crest is a leaping lion, which first appeared on a Millwall kit in 1979. It remained until 1999 and was re-introduced again in 2007. The club mascot is a giant lion called Zampa, named after Zampa Road, the road The Den is located on.

The Lions
The team nickname is The Lions, previously The Dockers. The original Dockers name arose from the job of many of the club's supporters in the early 1900s. The club did not like the moniker and changed the nickname after press headlined Millwall as 'Lions of the South', after knocking Football League leaders Aston Villa out of the 1899–1900 FA Cup. Millwall, then a Southern League side, went on to reach the semi-final. The club adopted the motto: We Fear No Foe Where E'er We Go. In the 2000s the club started to recognise its unique link with London's docks by introducing Dockers' Days, and archiving the club's dock roots in the Millwall FC Museum. Dockers' Days bring together past successful Millwall teams who parade on the pitch at half-time. Supporters who were dockers are allowed to attend the game for free. In 2011, Millwall officially named the east stand of The Den as the 'Dockers Stand' in honour of the club's former nickname.

Kit sponsors and manufacturers
For the 2013–14 season, Millwall chose the charity Prostate Cancer UK to sponsor their shirt for free.

Stadiums

History

Millwall began life on the Isle of Dogs and inhabited four different grounds in the club's first 25 years. Their first home was a piece of waste ground called Glengall Road, where they only stayed for one year. From 1886 to 1890 they played behind The Lord Nelson pub on East Ferry Road, which was known as the Lord Nelson Ground, before being forced to leave by the landlady, who received a better offer for its use.

They moved to their third home, The Athletic Grounds, on 6 September 1890. This was their first purpose-built ground, with a grandstand that seated 600 people and an overall capacity of between 10,000 and 15,000. The club was forced to move on again though, this time by the Millwall Dock Company who wanted to use it as a timberyard. They relocated in 1901 to a location near their second home, which became known as North Greenwich. They remained an east London club for a further nine years, with the last game played on the Isle of Dogs on 8 October 1910 against Portsmouth, which Millwall won 3–1.

On 22 October 1910, Millwall crossed the river to South London, moving to Cold Blow Lane in New Cross. The fifth ground was called The Den, built at a cost of £10,000 by noted football ground architect Archibald Leitch. The first game played there was against Brighton & Hove Albion, which Brighton won 1–0. Millwall remained there for 83 years, until moving to their sixth and current ground, at first known as The New Den but now called simply The Den, on 4 August 1993. The ground has an all-seated capacity of 20,146. A Sporting CP team, managed by Bobby Robson helped open the ground by playing a friendly, which The Lions lost 2–1.

Bermondsey redevelopment controversy
In September 2016 Lewisham Council approved a compulsory purchase order (CPO) of land surrounding The Den rented by Millwall, as part of a major redevelopment of the "New Bermondsey" area. The plans were controversial because the developer, Renewal, is controlled by offshore companies with unclear ownership, and is seen by the club and local community to be profiteering by demolishing existing homes and businesses as well as Millwall's car-park and the Millwall Community Trust facility to build up to 2,400 new private homes, with no social housing. The club contemplated the possibility of having to relocate to Kent. Millwall had submitted their own plans for regeneration centred around the club itself, but the council voted in favour of Renewal's plans.

In December 2016 Private Eye reported how Renewal had been founded by a former Lewisham Council leader and senior officer, suggesting potential bias, and that the decision to approve Renewal's plans may have been made as far back as 2013 despite the fact that no due diligence had been able to be carried out by PricewaterhouseCoopers due to "poor" and "limited" access to information and management at Renewal, which is controlled from the Isle of Man and British Virgin Islands.

In the face of mounting community opposition and media scrutiny, the Council said in January 2017 it will not proceed with the CPO. However, it was later reported to be taking legal advice regarding other avenues of securing the CPO, and Council cabinet members will decide how to proceed after a "review". Private Eye reported that Millwall are continuing to explore relocation options in Kent.

Traditional songs
A tradition at The Den is the playing of the official club song "Let 'em Come", by Roy Green, as Millwall and the opposing team walk onto the pitch. It was specifically written for the club and the lyrics represent old London culture, such as eating jellied eels and having a glass of beer before going to the game. The song ends with all home fans standing, arms raised (usually in the direction of the travelling fans singing the last line, "Let 'em all... come down.... to The Den!" A television drama about a Millwall supporter and ex-docker, starring David Jason, featured a lyric from the song in its title, Come Rain Come Shine. The song was played on repeat at Wembley Stadium after Millwall gained promotion to the Championship in 2010. The song "Shoeshine Boy" by the Mills Blue Rhythm Band was played as the entrance song before "Let 'em Come".

Other songs that have been regularly played at The Den over the years in the build-up to a game include "London Calling" by The Clash, "No Surrender" by Bruce Springsteen, "Town Called Malice" by The Jam and "House of Fun" by Madness, which features the lyric "welcome to the lion's den...". Status Quo's cover version of "Rockin' All Over the World" is played after every home win.

Rivalries
Millwall were listed eighth out of a list of 92 Football League clubs with the most rivals, with West Ham United, Leeds United, Crystal Palace, and Charlton Athletic considering them a major rival. Portsmouth, Everton and Gillingham also share minor rivalries with Millwall, with hooliganism between their fans dating back to the 1970s.

Major rivalry with West Ham United

Millwall's fiercest rival is West Ham United. It is one of the most passionately contested local derbies in football. The two clubs have rarely met in recent years due to them playing in different leagues; the majority of their meetings happened before the First World War, with some 60 meetings between 1899 and 1915. The clubs have played 99 times since the first contest in 1899. Millwall have won 38, drawn 27 and lost 34. Despite violence between the two sets of supporters and calls for future games between the clubs to be played behind closed doors, they last met in the Football League Championship in 2011–12 with no outright ban on either set of fans, and no repeat of crowd trouble. The rivalry between the sides, specifically the clubs' two hooligan firms has been depicted on the big screen several times, in films such as Green Street.

Rivalry with Leeds United

Millwall share a fierce rivalry with Leeds United. The rivalry between the teams is intensified by both clubs' passionate fans and association with football hooliganism. The clubs' two hooligan firms; the Leeds United Service Crew and the Millwall Bushwackers were notorious in the 1970s and 80s for their violence, being called "dirty Leeds" and "the scourge of football" respectively. From 1920 to 2003 the sides met just 12 times; competing in different tiers for the majority of their histories, and neither considering the other a rival on the pitch. Since Leeds were relegated from the Premier League in 2004, the teams have met 28 times in 16 years. The rivalry began in League One during the 2007–08 season, with disorder and violent clashes between both sets of fans and the police at Elland Road. It continued into the 2008–09 season; where the teams were vying for promotion to the Championship, culminating in Millwall knocking Leeds out of the League One playoffs at the semi-final stage. The clubs have played each other 40 times and are evenly matched; Millwall has won 18, Leeds 17 and five games have ended in a draw.

South East London derbies

Millwall are closest in proximity to Charlton Athletic, with The Den and The Valley being less than four miles apart. They last met in July 2020, a 1–0 win for Millwall at the Valley. Since their first competitive game in 1921, Millwall have won 37, drawn 26 and lost 12. The Lions are unbeaten in their last twelve games against Charlton, spanning 24 years, where they have won seven and drawn five. The Addicks last win came in March 1996 at The Valley. The Lions last played against fellow South East London club Crystal Palace in the 2012–13 season when both teams were in the Football League Championship. They drew 0–0 at The Den and 2–2 at Selhurst Park. In almost 100 competitive games between the two clubs since 1906, Millwall have won 39, drawn 29 and lost 29.

Players

Current squad

Out on Loan

Millwall Under 21s

Player of the year
As voted by Millwall Supporters Club members and season ticket holders.

Personnel honours

English Football Hall of Fame
Millwall players inducted into the English Football Hall of Fame:

 Teddy Sheringham (2009)
 Ray Wilkins (2013)

PFA Fans' Player of the Year

Players included in the PFA Fans' Player of the Year whilst playing for Millwall:
 Jay Simpson (2008, while on loan from Arsenal) (First winner of the award whilst on loan at another club.)

PFA Team of the Year

Players included in the PFA Team of the Year whilst playing for Millwall:
 Tim Cahill (2004)
 Tim Cahill (2001)
 Matt Lawrence (2001)
 Neil Harris (2001)
 Alex Rae (1996)
 Alex Rae (1995)
 Ben Thatcher (1995)
 Colin Cooper (1993)
 Dave Cusack (1985)
 John Jackson (1980)
 Ray Evans (1976)
 Bryan King (1975)
 Bryan King (1974)

Notable former players
The following is a list of notable footballers who have played for Millwall, including players who have been honoured in Millwall's Hall of Fame, international players who were capped by their country while playing for Millwall, players who have been given a testimonial for 10 years of service at the club, players who have made over 100 appearances or scored 50 goals, and also 1885 founder member players who contributed significantly to the clubs' history.

|-
|valign="top"|
Algeria
 Hameur Bouazza

Antigua and Barbuda
 Mahlon Romeo

Australia
 Tim Cahill
 James Meredith
 Dave Mitchell
 Kevin Muscat
 Lucas Neill
 Jason van Blerk

Barbados
 Michael Gilkes
 Paul Ifill

Canada
 Marc Bircham
 Adrian Serioux
 Josh Simpson
 Kris Twardek

Comoros
 Jimmy Abdou

Czech Republic
 Jiří Skalák

England
 Gary Alexander
 Sam Allardyce
 Chris Armstrong
 Herbert Banks
 Mark Beard
 Gordon Bolland
 Ray Brand
 Les Briley
 Joe Broadfoot
 Peter Burridge
 John Calvey
 Jimmy Carter
 Nick Chatterton
 Steve Claridge
 Jack Cock
 Jimmy Constantine
 Colin Cooper
 Tony Craig
 Harry Cripps
 Ian Dawes
|width="33"| 
|valign="top"|
 Danny Dichio
 Marvin Elliott
 John Fashanu
 George Fisher
 Jack Fort
 Freddie Fox
 Paul Goddard
 Len Graham
 Lee Gregory
 Neil Harris
 Brian Horne
 Gordon Hill
 Richard Hill
 Terry Hurlock
 Johnny Johnson
 Len Julians
 Harry Kane
 Bryan King
 Barry Kitchener
 Matthew Lawrence
 David Livermore
 Dave Mangnall
 Alan McLeary
 Stuart Nethercott
 Derek Possee
 Andy Roberts
 Henry Roberts
 Paul Robinson
 Barry Rowan
 Neil Ruddock
 John Seasman
 Paul Shaw
 Teddy Sheringham
 Reg Smith
 Alex Stepney
 Keith Stevens
 John Willie Sutcliffe
 Tony Towner
 Alf Twigg
 Phil Walker
 Jed Wallace
 Darren Ward
 Keith Weller
 Dennis Wise
 Tony Witter
 Steve Wood
|width="33"| 
|valign="top"|
Iceland
 Jón Daði Böðvarsson

Jamaica
 Shaun Cummings

New Zealand
 Chris Wood

Nigeria
 Danny Shittu

Northern Ireland
 Daniel Ballard
 Tom Brolly
 Shane Ferguson
 Bryan Hamilton
 Ted Hinton
 Chris McGrath
 Billy McCullough
 Conor McLaughlin
 Josh McQuoid
 Anton Rogan
 Ian Stewart

Republic of Ireland
 Keith Branagan
 John Byrne
 Tony Cascarino
 Kenny Cunningham
 Alan Dunne
 Eamon Dunphy
 David Forde
 Jon Goodman
 Joe Haverty
 Charlie Hurley
 Mark Kennedy
 Andy Keogh
 Mick McCarthy
 Aiden O'Brien
 Kevin O'Callaghan
 Steven Reid
 Robbie Ryan
 Richard Sadlier
 Dave Savage
 Pat Saward
 Gary Waddock
 Shaun Williams
|width="33"| 
|valign="top"|
Saint Kitts and Nevis
 Bobby Bowry

Russia
 Sergei Yuran

Scotland
 Jordan Archer
 Willie Carr
 Stephen Crawford
 Hugh Curran
 Jimmy Forsyth
 Malcolm Finlayson
 John Gilchrist
 Paul Hartley
 Duncan Hean
 Alex Jardine
 John McGinlay
 Alex Rae

Trinidad & Tobago
 Carlos Edwards
 Justin Hoyte
 Tony Warner

United States of America
 Kasey Keller
 John Kerr
 Bruce Murray
 Zak Whitbread

Wales
 Malcolm Allen
 Joe Davies
 Walter Davis
 Jermaine Easter
 Paul Jones
 Dick Jones
 Steve Lovell
 Steve Lowndes
 John Lyons
 Steve Morison
 Ben Thatcher
 Alf Watkins

Note: Current player George Saville has been capped internationally while playing for Millwall, and will be added to the list when they leave the club.

Managers
There have been 34 permanent and 15 caretaker managers since the appointment of the club's first professional manager, Bert Lipsham on 4 May 1911. From 1890 to 1910, Millwall directors Kidd, Stopher and Saunders were honorary managers, also working under the title of club secretary. Bob Hunter is Millwall's longest serving manager, having stayed at the helm for 15 years. Prior to becoming manager, he was the club's trainer for 21 years. He died in office in 1933, having served at the club for a total of 36 years. Steve Claridge holds the shortest tenure at the club, having been in charge for a period of 36 days without ever taking charge of a first-team game. Every Millwall manager has come from the United Kingdom or Ireland.

(s) = secretary (c) = caretaker

Club officials

Board

Chairman: John Berylson
Chief Executive Officer: Steve Kavanagh
Directors: James Berylson, Constantine Gonticas, Trevor Keyse, Demos Kouvaris, Richard Press and Peter Garston

Coaching staff

Manager: Gary Rowett
Assistant Manager: Adam Barrett
First-Team Coach: Paul Robinson
Technical Coach: Joe Carnall
Goalkeeping Coach: Andy Marshall
U23 Elite Development Squad Manager: Kevin Nugent
U23 Elite Development Squad Assistant Manager: Paul Robinson
Academy Director: Scott Fitzgerald

Honours

Records and statistics

Barry Kitchener holds the record for Millwall appearances, having played 596 matches between 1966 and 1982. The goalscoring record is held by former manager Neil Harris, with 138 in all competitions. He broke the previous record of 111 goals, held by Teddy Sheringham on 13 January 2009, during a 3–2 away win at Crewe Alexandra. The club's widest victory margin in the league is 9–1, a scoreline which they achieved twice in their Football League Third Division South championship-winning year of 1927. They beat both Torquay United and Coventry City by this score at The Den. Millwall's heaviest league defeat was 8–1 away to Plymouth Argyle in 1932. The club's heaviest loss in all competitions was a 9–1 defeat at Aston Villa in an FA Cup fourth-round second-leg in 1946. Millwall's largest Cup win was 7–0 over Gateshead in 1936. Their highest scoring aggregate game was a 12-goal thriller at home to Preston North End in 1930 when Millwall lost 7–5.

Player records

See List of Millwall F.C. seasons for Millwall's top goalscorer each year since 1895.

Millwall in European football

On 22 May 2004 Millwall played Manchester United in the FA Cup Final, losing 3–0. As United had already qualified for the UEFA Champions League, Millwall were assured of playing in the UEFA Cup. Millwall played in the first round proper and lost 4–2 on aggregate to Ferencváros.

European record

Supporters and hooliganism

Millwall have averaged a gate close to 12,000 per home game over their 93 seasons in the Football League, while the club have spent the majority of that time yo-yoing back and forth between the second and third tiers of English football. Originally based in the East End of London, the club moved across the River Thames in 1910 to south east London and support is drawn from the surrounding areas. The club and fans have a historic association with football hooliganism, which came to prevalence in the 1970s and 1980s with a firm known originally as F-Troop, eventually becoming more widely known as the Millwall Bushwackers, who were one of the most notorious hooligan gangs in England. On five occasions The Den was closed by The FA and the club has received numerous fines for crowd disorder. The BBC documentary Panorama was invited into the club by Millwall in 1977 to show the hooligan reputation was a myth and being blown out of proportion by reporting. Instead the BBC portrayed hooliganism as being deeply rooted in Millwall, and linked them to the far-right political party National Front. The show was extremely damaging for the club. Former club chairman Reg Burr once commented: "Millwall are a convenient coat peg for football to hang its social ills on", an example being the reporting of convicted murderer Gavin Grant. Although he had played for eight different clubs, playing his fewest games (four) for Millwall, and was signed to Bradford City at the time, the BBC used the headline, "Former Millwall striker Gavin Grant guilty of murder".

The stigma of violence attached to Millwall can be traced back over 100 years. Millwall played local rivals West Ham United away at Upton Park on 17 September 1906 in a Western League game. Both sets of supporters were primarily made up of dockers, who lived and worked in the same locality in east London. Many were rivals working for opposing firms and vying for the same business. A local newspaper, East Ham Echo, reported that, "From the very first kick of the ball it was seen likely to be some trouble, but the storm burst when Dean and Jarvis came into collision (Millwall had two players sent off during the match). This aroused considerable excitement among the spectators. The crowds on the bank having caught the fever, free fights were plentiful." In the 1920s Millwall's ground was closed for two weeks after a Newport County goalkeeper, who had been struck by missiles, jumped into the crowd to confront some of the home supporters and was knocked unconscious. The ground was again closed for two weeks in 1934 following crowd disturbances after the visit of Bradford Park Avenue. Pitch invasions resulted in another closure in 1947 and in 1950 the club was fined after a referee and linesman were ambushed outside the ground.

In the 1960s, hooliganism in England became more widely reported. On 6 November 1965 Millwall beat west London club Brentford 2–1 away at Griffin Park and during the game a hand grenade was thrown onto the pitch from the Millwall end. Brentford's goalkeeper Chic Brodie picked it up, inspected it and threw it into his goal. It was later retrieved by police and determined to be a harmless dummy. There was fighting inside and outside the ground during the game between both sets of supporters, with one Millwall fan sustaining a broken jaw. The Sun newspaper ran the sensationalist grenade-related headline "Soccer Marches to War!" Trouble was reported at Loftus Road on 26 March 1966 during a match between Queens Park Rangers and Millwall, at a time when both sides were near the top of the league table pushing for promotion to Division Two, but the London derby was won 6–1 by the west London based team, QPR. In the second-half, a coin was thrown from the terraces, which struck Millwall player Len Julians on the head, drawing blood. The stadium announcer warned that the game would be abandoned if there were any more disturbances from the crowd, prompting some Millwall fans to invade the pitch in an unsuccessful attempt to get the game abandoned. When Millwall's unbeaten home record of 59 games came to an end against Plymouth Argyle in 1967, the windows of the away team's coach were smashed. In the same year, a referee was attacked and the FA ordered the club to erect fences around The Den's terracing. On 11 March 1978 a riot broke out at The Den during an FA Cup quarter-final between Millwall and Ipswich Town, with the home team losing 6–1. Fighting began on the terraces and spilled onto the pitch; dozens of fans were injured, with some hooligans turning on their own team's supporters leaving some innocent fans bloodied. Bobby Robson, then manager of Ipswich, said of Millwall fans afterward, "They [the police] should have turned the flamethrowers on them". In 1982 Millwall club chairman Alan Thorne threatened to close the club because of violence sparked by losing in the FA Cup to non-league side Slough Town.

The 1985 Kenilworth Road riot, after an FA Cup sixth-round match between Luton Town and Millwall on 13 March 1985, became one of the worst and widely reported incidents of football hooliganism to date. On that night, approximately 20,000 people packed into a ground that usually only held half that number to watch Luton beat Millwall 1–0. Numerous pitch invasions, fighting in the stands and missile-throwing occurred, of which one such object hit Luton's goalkeeper Les Sealey. It led to a ban on away supporters by Luton from their Kenilworth Road ground for four years. Luton were asked by Millwall to make the Wednesday night match all-ticket, but this was ignored. As a result, rival hooligan firms gained access to the stadium. As well as the Millwall hooligans and those belonging to Luton's firm the MIGs, many of the 31 fans arrested after the violence were identified as being from Chelsea's Headhunters firm and West Ham United's Inter City Firm. The FA commissioned an inquiry which concluded that it was "not satisfied that Millwall F.C. took all reasonable precautions in accordance with the requirements of FA Rule 31(A)(II)." A£7,500 fine was levied against Millwall, though this was later withdrawn on appeal. The penalty that Millwall faced was perhaps that the club's name was now "synonymous with everything that was bad in football and society".

In May 2002, hundreds of hooligans attaching themselves to Millwall were involved in disorder around the ground, after the team lost a play-off game to Birmingham City. It was described by the BBC as one of the worst cases of civil disorder seen in Great Britain in recent times. A police spokeswoman said that 47 police officers and 24 police horses were injured, and the Metropolitan Police considered suing the club after the events. The then chairman Theo Paphitis responded that Millwall could not be blamed for the actions of a mindless minority who attach themselves to the club. "The problem of mob violence is not solely a Millwall problem, it is not a football problem, it is a problem which plagues the whole of our society", he said. Paphitis later introduced a membership scheme whereby only fans who would be prepared to join and carry membership cards would be allowed into The Den. Scotland Yard withdrew its threat to sue, stating: "In light of the efforts made and a donation to a charity helping injured police officers, the Metropolitan Police Service has decided not to pursue legal action against Millwall F.C. in relation to the disorder". Some legal experts said it would have been difficult to hold a football club responsible for something that occurred away from its ground and involved people who did not attend the match. The scheme introduced by Paphitis now only applies to perceived high-risk away games. Many fans blame the scheme for diminishing Millwall's away support, such as at Leeds United where fans are issued with vouchers which are then exchanged for tickets at a designated point of West Yorkshire Police's choosing on the day of the game. Also, early kick-off times arranged by the police often result in only a few hundred fans making the trip.

In January 2009, hundreds of Millwall fans perceived as "high risk" individuals gained access to an FA Cup fourth-round match away at Hull City. The game, won 2–0 by Hull, was overshadowed when seats, coins and plastic bottles were thrown by some away supporters. There were conflicting reports in the media as to whether missiles were initially thrown by Hull supporters following chanting and jeering by Millwall fans of Jimmy Bullard (an ex-West Ham player) just prior to the fixture. On 25 August 2009, Millwall played away at West Ham United in the Football League Cup, losing 3–1 after extra time. One Millwall supporter was stabbed during clashes between the two sets of fans outside the ground. The game saw hundreds of West Ham fans invade the pitch on three occasions, forcing the game to be temporarily suspended once. The police later said the violence, because of its scale, was organised beforehand. In the aftermath of the disorder, Millwall were handed three charges by the FA and later cleared of all of them; West Ham received four charges and were found guilty on two counts: violent, threatening, obscene and provocative behaviour, and entering the field of play. West Ham were fined £115,000, an amount seen as an insult by Millwall, which staunchly defended the actions of its own fans and the club's inability to do any more than it had for a match at a rival's ground.

After a game against Queens Park Rangers at Loftus Road in September 2010, manager Kenny Jackett said Millwall's hooligan problems are to a certain extent exaggerated by media sensationalism. "I see it as unjust. We are an easy club to criticise and in my time [at the club], the way we have been reported is unfair", he said. Other examples of this include archive footage of their hooligan element's past bad behaviour being shown, when disorder has occurred at other grounds, not involving them. During a game between Millwall and Huddersfield Town, The Observer reported that a Huddersfield Town fan had thrown a coin at a linesman, and that some Millwall fans had intervened, and handed the culprit over to police. The News of the World, however, bore the headline: "Millwall Thugs Deck Linesman With Concrete". This has led to a siege mentality among supporters of the club, which gave rise to the Millwall fans' famous terrace chant, No one likes us, we don't care, being sung in defiant defence of themselves and their team. In April 2013, Millwall met Wigan Athletic in a semi-final of the FA Cup. Millwall lost the game 2–0. Towards the end of the match, violence broke out in part of the stand allocated to Millwall, with individuals fighting amongst themselves and then against police, resulting in 14 arrests, of which two were Wigan supporters. In January 2014, a Millwall fan ripped a linesman's flag after a corner was not given to his side during a game against Leicester City; Millwall lost 1–3. On 29 May 2016, Millwall played in the Football League One play-off final against Barnsley at Wembley Stadium, but towards the end of the match, with Barnsley winning 3–1, a group of Millwall supporters broke through a security barrier and attacked Barnsley supporters, some of whom were forced to leave the stadium to avoid the violence. Also there were objects thrown towards the Barnsley players and Barnsley supporters during the game. The fighting and violence was condemned by the Football Association. On 26 January 2019, Millwall beat Everton 3–2 and knocked them out of the FA Cup. The two teams supporters clashed away from The Den before the game, with an Everton fan being slashed across the face with a knife. A senior Metropolitan Police officer said, it was "some of the most shocking football violence seen for some time". The game was also blighted by allegations of racist chanting.

On 5 December 2020, Millwall played against Derby County in the first game back at the Den for fans in ten months due to the COVID-19 Pandemic. Some of the 2,000 fans present booed the players who took a knee and raised a fist before the game in support of the Black Lives Matter social and political movement. The booing was condemned by The FA, EFL, Kick it Out, and mainstream media. Cabinet minister George Eustice refused to condemn Millwall fans, stating Black Live Matter political movement was against what most British people believed in and fans should be free to express their views. The leader of the Brexit Party Nigel Farage called BLM a Marxist Party who had been "sussed out" by Millwall fans and called for kneeling to stop. In the next game at the Den against QPR on 8 December 2020, Millwall fans applauded as QPR and Millwall players raised aloft an anti-racism banner about inequality in football. The 2,000 Millwall fans also cheered the QPR players who took the knee. No Millwall player kneeled. Before the game, every fan was given a letter from the club saying, "The eyes of the world are on this football club tonight – your club – and they want us to fail. Together as one, we will not let that happen." Some Millwall supporters had said their boos at the Derby game did not have racist intent, but was instead against the politicisation of the Black Lives Matter movement in the UK.

Notable supporters

In the community
In 1985, the club founded the Millwall Community Trust (MCT), which offers sporting, educational and charitable projects. The Trust is based next door to The Den, in the Lions Centre. Working with local people from the surrounding boroughs of Lewisham, Southwark and the wider Millwall Community. The Trust offers sports and fitness programmes, educational workshops, disability activities and soccer schools. The club helps promote anti-knife and anti-gun crime. In a match against Charlton Athletic in 2009, both teams wore special kits for the match in honour of murdered local teenagers and supporters Jimmy Mizen and Rob Knox. The logos of both clubs' shirt sponsors were replaced by the text, "Street violence ruins lives". The club has also helped raise over £10,000 for the charity Help for Heroes.

In popular culture
Millwall have been depicted in films several times, specifically highlighting the club's hooliganism firm the Bushwackers and the rivalry with West Ham United. Often glorifying football violence in the beginning, each film typically ends in loss of life, showing the futility of hooliganism.

The Firm (1989) – Real life Millwall supporter Gary Oldman plays Bex, leader of football firm the Inter City Crew, a fictional representation of West Ham's Inter City Firm and their violent exploits. Millwall's Bushwackers firm are called The Buccaneers in the film.

Arrivederci Millwall (1990) – A group of Millwall supporters travel to the 1982 World Cup in Spain, just after the Falklands War breaks out, intent on avenging a personal loss.

Black Books (2000) – In the first episode "Cooking the Books", Bernard Black (Dylan Moran) attempts to antagonise some Millwall hooligans into injuring him severely enough so that he may avoid doing his taxes. Upon remarking, "How does the song go? Millwall, Millwall, we're really dreadful and all of our girlfriends are unfulfilled and alienated," he succeeds.
The Football Factory (2004) – Primarily about the Chelsea Headhunters, who fight numerous other firms on away days, culminating in a big fight against Millwall's Bushwackers.
Green Street (2005) – Elijah Wood plays an American student who gets involved with West Ham's firm. The film builds up to a big clash with Millwall's firm at the climax, after the two teams are drawn against each other in the Cup, foreshadowing similarities to the 2009 Upton Park riot.
Rise of the Footsoldier (2007) – The rise of a football hooligan is chronicled from his beginnings on the terraces to becoming a member of a notorious gang of criminals. The rivalry between West Ham and Millwall is portrayed during the opening scenes of the film.

Dhan Dhana Dhan Goal (2007) – The main protagonist Sunny Bhasin (John Abraham) initially agrees to leave Southhall United Football Club and signs a lucrative offer to play for Millwall F.C. He later decides not to play for Millwall though.
Green Street 2: Stand Your Ground (2009) – A direct-to-video sequel to Green Street. It follows on directly from the original's climax, with several members of West Ham's and Millwall's firms ending up in prison together and arranging a football match.
The Firm (2009) –  A remake by Nick Love, director of The Football Factory and himself a Millwall supporter. Set in the 1980s, the film focuses on the music, fashion and culture surrounding football at the time. It was generally well received by critics. In October 2009, the Metropolitan Police released still photos from the film in relation to a search for hooligans from the Upton Park riot. The mistake led to an apology from Scotland Yard.

St George's Day (2012) – A British gangster film which featured cameos from Millwall players Liam Trotter, Alan Dunne, David Forde, Darren Ward and Scott Barron. The film also included several Millwall references such as 'No One Likes Us' and 'We Fear No Foe'.
In seasons two (2013) and three (2014) of the Norwegian television series Lilyhammer, Paul Kaye guest stars as London gangster Duncan Hammer. The character implies that he is or was a supporter of Millwall, while discussing and using a "Millwall brick" to assault a debtor.

The club's ground The Den doubled as The Dragons Lair, home ground of fictional team Harchester United in the television series Dream Team. It also appeared in episodes of the shows The Bill and Primeval. In literature, books such as "No One Likes Us, We Don't Care: True Stories from Millwall, Britain's Most Notorious Football Hooligans" by Andrew Woods focuses on the hooligan element of Millwall. Sunday Mirror columnist Michael Calvin spent the 2009–10 season covering Millwall, writing the book Family: Life, Death and Football. The book looks at the rivalry with West Ham United, the stabbing of a Millwall supporter and the Lions play-off success and promotion to The Championship under Kenny Jackett.

References

Bibliography

Further reading

External links

 Official website

News
 
 Millwall news from Sky Sports
 News at Den from Southwark News

General
 Millwall History Files
 Millwall FC – The Millwall Years
 Millwall Supporters Club
 Past Millwall kits (1885–present)

 
Association football clubs established in 1885
Companies formerly listed on the Alternative Investment Market
Football clubs in England
Football clubs in London
EFL Championship clubs
English Football League clubs
Southern Football League clubs
1885 establishments in England
Bermondsey
Companies that have entered administration in the United Kingdom